Maestre may refer to:

People with the name
Maestre is a Spanish surname. Notable people with the surname include:

"Maestre Joan", an historical case which may have inspired the tale of the sailor Pedro Serrano
Aureliano Maestre de San Juan (1828–1890), Spanish scientist
Diomedes Díaz Maestre (1957–2013), Colombian singer
Gabriel Maestre (born 1986), Venezuelan boxer
Jennifer Maestre (born 1959), American artist
Manuel Herrero Maestre (born 1967), Spanish footballer and manager
Rafael Orozco Maestre (1954–1992), Colombian singer

Fictional characters
 Maestres in A Song of Ice and Fire universe, an order of scholars, healers, messengers, and scientists, including such characters as:
Archmaestre Ebrose at the Citadel in Oldtown
Grand Maestre Pycelle, at the Red Keep in Kings Landing
Maestre Aemon Targaryen at Castle Black, at the Wall
 Maester Wolkan at Castle Black, at the Wall
Qyburn, a former Maester who lost his chain for unethical experiments

Other uses
Maestre de campo, a rank created in 1534 by the Emperor Carlos V
Maestre de Campo Island, Concepcion, Romblon, Philippines
Maestre-Kallmann-Morsier syndrome, a genetic disorder

See also
Maestro
Master (disambiguation)

Spanish-language surnames